Griffin LaMarre (born November 10, 1996) is an American ice sled hockey player. He was a member of the United States national team that won gold at the 2022 Winter Paralympics.

Career
LaMarre represented the United States at the 2022 Winter Paralympics and won a gold medal. He made his Paralympic debut on March 6, 2022, in the third period of a game against South Korea. He entered the game as a reserve goalie for Jen Lee and allowed one goal in 15 minutes.

References 

1996 births
Living people
People from Haverhill, Massachusetts
American sledge hockey players
Paralympic sledge hockey players of the United States
Paralympic gold medalists for the United States
Para ice hockey players at the 2022 Winter Paralympics
Medalists at the 2022 Winter Paralympics
Paralympic medalists in sledge hockey